Bruce Carl Berndt (born March 13, 1939, in St. Joseph, Michigan) 
is an American mathematician. Berndt attended college at Albion College, graduating in 1961, where he also ran track. He received his master's and doctoral degrees from the University of Wisconsin–Madison. He lectured for a year at the University of Glasgow and then, in 1967, was appointed an assistant professor at the University of Illinois at Urbana-Champaign, where he has remained since. In 1973–74 he was a visiting scholar at the Institute for Advanced Study in Princeton. He is currently Michio Suzuki Distinguished Research Professor of Mathematics at the University of Illinois.

Berndt is an analytic number theorist who is probably best known for his work explicating the discoveries of Srinivasa Ramanujan. He is a coordinating editor of The Ramanujan Journal and, in 1996, received an expository Steele Prize from the American Mathematical Society for his work editing Ramanujan's Notebooks. A Lester R. Ford Award was given to Berndt, with Gerd Almkvist, in 1989 and to Berndt, with S. Bhargava, in 1994.

In 2012 he became a fellow of the American Mathematical Society.
In December 2012 he received an honorary doctorate from SASTRA University in Kumbakonam, India.

Selected publications
Ramanujan: Letters and Commentary (History of Mathematics, V. 9), by Bruce C. Berndt and Robert A. Rankin (American Mathematical Society, 1995)
Ramanujan: Essays and Surveys (History of Mathematics, V. 22), by Bruce C. Berndt and Robert A. Rankin (American Mathematical Society, 2001)
The Continued Fractions Found in the Unorganized Portions of Ramanujan's Notebooks (Memoirs of the American Mathematical Society), by Bruce C. Berndt, L. Jacobsen, R. L. Lamphere, George E. Andrews (Editor), Srinivasa Ramanujan Aiyangar (Editor) (American Mathematical Society, 1993)
Ramanujan's Notebooks, Part I, by Bruce C. Berndt (Springer, 1985)
Ramanujan's Notebooks, Part II, by Bruce C. Berndt (Springer, 1999)
Ramanujan's Notebooks, Part III, by Bruce C. Berndt (Springer, 2004)
Ramanujan's Notebooks, Part IV, by Bruce C. Berndt (Springer, 1993)
Ramanujan's Notebooks, Part V, by Bruce C. Berndt (Springer, 2005)
Ramanujan's Lost Notebook, Part I, by George Andrews and Bruce C. Berndt (Springer, 2005)
Ramanujan's Lost Notebook, Part II, George E. Andrews, Bruce C. Berndt (Springer, 2008)
 Ramanujan's Lost Notebook: Part III, George E. Andrews, Bruce C. Berndt (Springer, 2012)
 Ramanujan's Lost Notebook: Part IV, George E. Andrews, Bruce C. Berndt (Springer, 2013)
 Ramanujan's Lost Notebook: Part V, George E. Andrews, Bruce C. Berndt (Springer, 2018)
Number Theory in the Spirit of Ramanujan by Bruce C. Berndt (American Mathematical Society, 2006)
Number Theory and Modular Forms: Papers in Memory of Robert A. Rankin (Developments in Mathematics), by Bruce Berndt (Editor), Ken Ono (Editor) (Springer, 2003)

See also
Ramanujan's lost notebook

References

External links
 Bruce C. Berndt, home page at UIUC.
 University of Illinois LASNews article on Berndt's work with Ramanujan's Lost Notebooks

20th-century American mathematicians
21st-century American mathematicians
Living people
1939 births
Number theorists
University of Illinois Urbana-Champaign faculty
University of Wisconsin–Madison alumni
Institute for Advanced Study visiting scholars
Albion College alumni
Fellows of the American Mathematical Society